Félicia Ballanger (born 12 June 1971 in La Roche-sur-Yon, Vendée) is a retired French racing cyclist.

She won five world championships in the sprint and 500 m time trial. She was also a triple Olympic champion.

Biography 
Félicia Ballanger is one of two children. Her mother named her Félicia after the Italian Tour de France winner Felice Gimondi and her brother, Frédéric, after the Spanish winner, Federico Bahamontes).

Ballanger was at first both a cyclist and a handball player. For cycling she was a member of Vendée la Roche Cycliste.

She came fourth in her first world championship and again the following year, 1992, at the Olympic Games in Barcelona. She crashed the following year, breaking a collarbone and having her thigh pierced by a splinter from the velodrome.

Her first world championship medal came the following season. She took silver in the sprint. Trained by Daniel Morelon, the former world sprint champion, she won her first world championships in 1995, winning the 500 m time-trial and the sprint. She won both again in the four following years. She also won the Olympic sprint medal at Atlanta.

Her last international was the 2000 Olympic Games in Sydney. She won the 500 metres. In the same year she was awarded the Vélo d'Or français, and remained the only female awardee until 2022. In 2001, she became vice-president of the Fédération Française de Cyclisme.

Personal life

Ballanger is married, has two children and has lived in Nouméa since 1998. She is involved in politics there. She was a television commentator during the Olympic Games in Beijing in 2008.

Palmarès

Olympic Games 
  1996 1st sprint
  2000 1st sprint, 1st 500m

World championship 
  1995, 1996, 1997, 1998, 1999 1st sprint
  1995, 1996, 1997, 1998, 1999 1st 500m
  1994 2nd sprint
 1988 1st junior sprint

National championships
 Sprint: 1992, 1994...
 Youth sprint : 1986

World records 
 500m 35"811 3 July 1993 Hyères
 500m 35"190 28 July1993 Bordeaux
 500m 34"604 3 July 1994 Hyères
 500m 34"474 22 July 1994 Colorado Springs
 500m 34"017 29 September Bogota
 500m 34"010 29 August1998 Bordeaux

References

External links
 
 
 

1971 births
Living people
People from La Roche-sur-Yon
French female cyclists
UCI Track Cycling World Champions (women)
Olympic cyclists of France
Cyclists at the 1992 Summer Olympics
Cyclists at the 1996 Summer Olympics
Cyclists at the 2000 Summer Olympics
Olympic gold medalists for France
Olympic medalists in cycling
Officers of the Ordre national du Mérite
Medalists at the 2000 Summer Olympics
Medalists at the 1996 Summer Olympics
French track cyclists
Sportspeople from Vendée
Cyclists from Pays de la Loire